Gondaman (also Romanized as Gondamān and Gandomān) is a village in Il Gavark Rural District, in the Central District of Bukan County, West Azerbaijan Province, Iran. At the 2006 census, its population was 134, in 25 families.

References 

Populated places in Bukan County